The Sunbeam Nubian, also called the Sunbeam 155 hp, was a British 8-cylinder aero-engine that was first run in 1916.

Design and development
In March 1916 Louis Coatalen, the chief designer at Sunbeam, responded to the Admiralty's request for more powerful engines by designing the V-8 Nubian. The Nubian featured the twin overhead camshafts and four valves of his prewar engines for Grand Prix and TT racing cars.

The original engine was built with a 60 degree angle between cylinder banks but severe vibration problems forced Coatalen to redesign it with a 90 degree angle, emerging as the Nubian II. Intended to power the Supermarine AD Flying Boat the teething troubles of the Nubian forced Supermarine to use a  Hispano-Suiza V-8 engine instead.

Deliveries of the Nubian II began in October 1917, by which time the Nubian was overshadowed by the more powerful V-8s from Hispano-Suiza and the  Sunbeam Arab. The only aircraft known to have been powered by a Nubian was the Saunders T.1, but some of the 36 engines built, of 50 ordered, are believed to have been supplied to the Imperial Russian Air Service.

The Nubian suffered from a poor design decision at first and was overtaken by events which prevented widespread use, but its cousin, the V-12 Sunbeam Afridi and its family members found greater success.

Variants
Sunbeam Nubian
Sunbeam Nubian II
Redesigned with 90 degree cylinder angle to alleviate severe vibration problems, the Nubian II was late in delivery and was not widely used.

Applications
Saunders T.1
Blackburn GP - handed left and right

Specifications (Nubian II)

See also

References

Bibliography
 
 Lumsden, Alec. British Piston Engines and their Aircraft. Marlborough, Wiltshire: Airlife Publishing, 2003. .

External links
Sunbeam Overhead Cam Engines

Nubian
1910s aircraft piston engines